Kendall Nichole Phillips (born December 28, 1991) is an American country singer-songwriter, and actress. She is most recently known for being a 2010 and 2011 National Finalist in the Colgate Country Showdown and for being a contestant on the 2006 season of American Idol.

In 2007 Phillips was featured in Chicken Soup for the Soul's Chicken Soup For the American Idol Soul. Later that year Kendall's music video for her single "It's You" made the Top 64 videos on CMT's Music City Madness and was featured on CMT.com.

In late December 2012 Kendall signed with sponsor, Alpha Energy, partnering with NASCAR and Turner Motorsports driver, Ben Rhodes for upcoming events in 2013. Shortly after, Kendall signed a deal with HMG Nashville and celebrity publicist, Jackie Monaghan for the release of the lead single off her upcoming album, "You Should Know". "You Should Know" released to radio in the United States and Canada in January 2013.

References

External links
 
 Artist Kendall Phillips talk to Professor Kendall Phillips on the Pop-Talk Podcast of WAER-FM

1988 births
Living people
American women country singers
American country singer-songwriters
People from Zionsville, Indiana
21st-century American singers
21st-century American women singers
Country musicians from Indiana
Singer-songwriters from Indiana